Chambucha is a location in Walikale Territory, North Kivu, Democratic Republic of the Congo. It lies along the N3 highway just north of the border of South Kivu.

References

Populated places in North Kivu